Mettel Field  is a public airport three miles north of Connersville, in Fayette County, Indiana. It is owned by the Connersville Board of Aviation Commissioners. The National Plan of Integrated Airport Systems for 2011–2015 categorized it as a general aviation facility.

For a short time circa 1951 Lake Central scheduled Bonanzas to Mettel.

Facilities
Mettel Field covers 444 acres (180 ha) at an elevation of 866 feet (264 m). It has two runways: 18/36 is 6,503 by 100 feet (1,982 x 30 m) asphalt and 4/22 is 2,601 by 100 feet (793 x 30 m) turf.

In 2009 the airport had 8,772 aircraft operations, average 24 per day: 96% general aviation, 4% air taxi, and <1% military. Nine aircraft were then based at this airport: 78% single-engine and 22% multi-engine.

References

External links 
 Aerial image from Indiana DOT
 Aerial image as of March 1998 from USGS The National Map
 
 

Airports in Indiana
Transportation buildings and structures in Fayette County, Indiana